Bread pudding is a bread-based dessert popular in many countries' cuisines. It is made with stale bread and milk or cream, generally containing eggs, a form of fat such as oil, butter or suet and, depending on whether the pudding is sweet or savory, a variety of other ingredients. Sweet bread puddings may use sugar, syrup, honey, dried fruit, nuts, as well as spices such as cinnamon, nutmeg, mace, or vanilla. The bread is soaked in the liquids, mixed with the other ingredients, and baked.

Savory puddings like breakfast strata may be served as main courses, while sweet puddings are typically eaten as desserts.

In other languages, its name is a translation of "bread pudding" or even just "pudding", for example "pudín" or "budín". In the Philippines, banana bread pudding is popular. In Mexico, there is a similar dish eaten during Lent called capirotada. In the United Kingdom, a moist version of Nelson cake, itself a bread pudding, is nicknamed "Wet Nelly".

History

The 18th-century English cookbook The Compleat Housewife contains two recipes for baked bread pudding. The first is identified as "A Bread and Butter Pudding for Fasting Days". To make the pudding a baking dish is lined with puff pastry, and slices of penny loaf with butter, raisins and currants, and pieces of butter are added in alternating layers. Over this is poured thickened, spiced cream and orange blossom water, and the dish is baked in the oven. There is another version of the dish that is simpler, omitting the spices and dried fruits.

Regional variations 

In Belgium, particularly Brussels, bread pudding is baked with brown sugar, cinnamon, stale bread, and raisins or apple.

In Canada, bread pudding is sometimes made with maple syrup.

In Hong Kong, bread pudding is usually served with vanilla cream dressing.

In Hungary, it is called 'Máglyarakás' (literally, "bonfire") which is baked with whipped egg whites on top.

In Malaysia, bread pudding is eaten with custard sauce.

In Mecklenburg-Vorpommern, Germany, black bread is used to make "black bread pudding" (Schwarzbrotpudding).

In the Philippines, stale unsold bread are commonly used by bakeries to make the characteristically bright red filling of pan de regla.

In the United States, especially Louisiana, bread puddings are typically sweet and served as dessert with a sweet sauce of some sort, such as whiskey sauce, rum sauce, or caramel sauce, but typically sprinkled with sugar and eaten warm in squares or slices. Sometimes, bread pudding is served warm topped with or alongside a dollop of whipped cream or a scoop of vanilla ice cream. In Puerto Rico, there are many variations of bread pudding on the island. Cream cheese with lime zest and guava or coconut-sweet plantain with rum raisins is perhaps the most popular. Bread pudding is always made with a variety of spices. Puerto Rican bread pudding is cooked the same as crème caramel with caramel poured into a baking dish and then the pudding mix is poured on top. The baking dish is placed in a bain-marie and then in the oven.

In Argentina, Paraguay, and Uruguay, bread pudding is known as "budín de pan".

In Brazil, bread pudding is known as "pudim de pão".

In Panama, bread pudding is known as "mamallena".

In Aruba, bread pudding is known as "pan bolo".

In Cuba, bread pudding is known as "pudín de pan" and many serve it with a guava marmalade.

In Chile, bread pudding is known as "colegial" or "budín de pan".

See also 

 Bread and butter pudding
 Ekmek kadayıfı
 Cabinet pudding
 Klappertaart
 List of bread dishes
 Pain à la grecque

References

External links 

 
 

American desserts
Argentine desserts
Australian desserts
New Zealand desserts
Paraguayan desserts
Uruguayan desserts
Canadian cuisine
British puddings
English cuisine
Louisiana cuisine
Cuban cuisine
Belgian cuisine
Puerto Rican cuisine
Colombian cuisine
Bahamian cuisine
Bread dishes
Christmas food
Puff pastry
Dried fruit
Louisiana Creole cuisine